Sheep Creek is located  southeast of Juneau, in the U.S. state of Alaska. The Juneau community of Thane was originally called Sheep Creek. The Snettisham hydroelectric dam substation is situated on a trail spur. Sheep Creek Hatchery is located at the outflow.

Geography
Flowing from the water parting next to Grindstone Creek, the course of the main valley runs from southeast to northwest. About  from its head, the stream makes a broad turn and in the lower , flows toward the southwest. The upper and lower thirds of its course have steep grades, but the middle course is over a gravel flat sloping from  elevation. Below the gravel flat, the tributary slopes are very narrow and there are no side gulches. The generally smooth, but somewhat corrugated character of the slopes points to the molding action of ice, and the recency of glaciation is indicated by the shallowness of the rills, which collect the drainage from the mountain sides.

The trail is wide and is in gravel formations and hence is not slippery as in the case of mud formed trails, and easy to access.

Geology
The formations of Gold Creek extend without interruption southeastward to Taku Inlet, but only the two outer divisions—namely, the black slate and the group of green stones and intercalated slate—are cut by Sheep Creek. The black slates contain dikes of dark diorite (altered gubbro), which follow the general trend of the formation. However, these rocks have not been greatly affected by vein waters. This rock has been impregnated to a certain extent by sulphides and locally contains stringers of quartz. This intrusion cuts a dike of the dark diorite.

Flora and fauna
Notable flora reported are berries on which the bears feed in the entire valley, wild geranium, columbine, Dodecatheon, or "shooting stars", Fritillaria affinis or "chocolate lilies", blueberry and salmonberry bushes.

The fauna reported in the valley are: Mountain goats and black bear. During late summer, chum salmon (also called dog) Oncorhynchus keta fully clog the stream waters from bank to bank, and is popular location to witness the fishes and also do fishing in the stream. Sheep Creek Hatchery was established in 1980 with the objective of incubating about 40 million pink and/or chum salmon for use in commercial fisheries. The Coho Annex facility became part of this hatchery as the coho brood stock source. In the following years, this expanded into the Macaulay Salmon Hatchery, which is now the coho rearing facility.

See also
Juneau gold belt

References
This article contains public domain text from A.C. Spencer's "The Juneau gold belt, Alaska: A reconnaissance of Admiralty Island, Alaska" (1906)

Rivers of Juneau, Alaska
Rivers of Alaska